Huberto Rohden Sobrinho, known as Huberto Rohden, (1893–1981) was a Brazilian philosopher, educator and theologist.

He was born in São Ludgero.

A pioneer of transcendentalism in Brazil who wrote more than 100 works, where he taught ecumenical lecture of spiritual approach towards Education, Philosophy, Science, emphasizing self-knowledge.

Rohden was a major proposer of a cosmo philosophy, which consists of an individual cosmic harmony within a "cosmocracy": a self-governed individual through universal ethical laws in connection with a collective consciousness of the universe and the flourishing of the divine essence of humans, assuming one has to be responsible for its acts and pursue an intimate reform, with no appeal to an ecclesiastic authority to release the debts of its moral behaviour.

He is a translator of the New Testament, of the Bhagavad Gita, the Tao Te Ching; he was concerned with editing them with low prices, in order to enable access to these works.

A former jesuit priest during the beginning of the literary career; major in Sciences, Philosophy and Theology at the Innsbruck University (Austria), Valkenburg and Napoles (Italy).

In Brazil he founded the Instituição Cultural e Beneficente Alvorada (1952), taught at the Princeton University, American University (Washington D.C.) and at the Universidade Presbiteriana Mackenzie (Sao Paulo, Brazil). Delivered lectures in the United States, India and Portugal.

External links 
 Audio
  H. Rohden Memory
 Biography, Poems and Lecture
 Interview
 Martin Claret Publisher House
 

20th-century Brazilian philosophers
1893 births
1981 deaths
Translators of the Bible into Portuguese
Brazilian people of German descent
People from Santa Catarina (state)
20th-century translators
South American biblical scholars